Rannveig is a feminine given name of Old Norse. Notable people with the name are as follows:

First name

 Rannveig Aamodt (born 1984), Norwegian rock climber
 Rannveig Andresen (born 1967), Norwegian politician 
 Rannveig Djønne (born 1974), Norwegian folk musician
 Rannveig Guðmundsdóttir (born 1940), Icelandic politician
 Rannveig Þorsteinsdóttir (1904–1987), Icelandic lawyer and politician

Middle name
 Elín Rannveig Briem (1856–1937), Icelandic teacher and writer
 Sunna Rannveig Davíðsdóttir, known as Sunna Davíðsdóttir (born 1985), Icelandic mixed martial artist 
 Svanborg Rannveig Jónsdóttir (born 1953), Icelandic academic
 Margrét Rannveig Ólafsdóttir (born 1976), Icelandic football player
 Ida Rannveig Roggen, known as Ida Roggen (born 1978), Norwegian jazz singer

See also
 Ranveig, list of people with a similar name

References

Icelandic feminine given names
Norwegian feminine given names